A. agrestis may refer to:

Achlidon agrestis, a crab species
Amynthas agrestis, a worm species
Anthoceros agrestis, a bryophyte species
Antiblemma agrestis, a moth species
Astragalus agrestis, a flowering plant species
Austrodrillia agrestis, a sea snail species
Auximobasis agrestis, a moth species

Synonyms
Agoseris agrestis, a synonym of Agoseris glauca, a flowering plant species
Alopecurus agrestis, a synonym of Alopecurus creticus, a grass species
Anthemis agrestis, a synonym of Anthemis arvensis, a flowering plant species